Rush Hour is an American police procedural comedy-drama television series developed by Bill Lawrence and Blake McCormick that is based on the film of the same name. Similar to the films, the series follows Detective Carter, a radical LAPD detective, and Detective Lee, a by-the-book detective from Hong Kong, as they are forced into an unlikely partnership. CBS placed a series order on May 8, 2015. The show premiered on March 31, 2016.

On May 16, 2016, CBS cancelled the show after one season. On May 26, 2016, CBS removed the show from its schedule; however, they later announced the show would return on July 23, 2016, to burn off the remaining episodes. The series finale aired on August 20, 2016.

Cast

Main
 Justin Hires as Detective James Steven Carter, a reckless LAPD detective who is partnered with a serious detective from Hong Kong, Detective Lee. He is based on the character that Chris Tucker portrayed in the Rush Hour film series. 
 Jon Foo as Detective Jonathan Lee, a strict detective from Hong Kong who is partnered with a brash detective from the LAPD, Detective Carter. He is based on the character that Jackie Chan portrayed in the Rush Hour film series. Unlike in the films, Lee does not carry a firearm on the job, due to being haunted by having to kill someone with one in Hong Kong sometime before the series.
 Aimee Garcia as Sergeant Didi Diaz, Carter's former partner. After her son Derrick was born, she decided to work from her desk instead of on the streets. To avoid her from being humiliated from the other cops, Carter took the heat and let them believe that he dumped her as a partner. 
 Page Kennedy as Gerald Page, a low life criminal and Carter's cousin who is secretly his and Lee's informant to help them solve cases. When he was 16, he and Carter robbed a man outside a liquor store with an unloaded BB gun. When the cops arrived, he told Carter to run, believing that his cousin had more potential in life than he ever would.
 Wendie Malick as Captain Lindsay Cole, Carter's and Lee's no nonsense captain. She gets annoyed with Carter's wild behavior when he's on a case, but also recognizes that he's a great detective. She finds Detective Lee extremely attractive.

Recurring
 Jessika Van as MSS Agent Kim Lee, a former Hong Kong police officer and Lee's younger sister. When she first arrived in Los Angeles, she seemingly joined the Quantou, a dangerous Chinese crime organization, believing that her big brother wasn't letting her live up to her full potential as a cop. In "Assault on Precinct 7", she is revealed to be an MSS agent undercover in the organization, but opts to keep this hidden from Lee to protect him. In the series finale, she is reassigned following the collapse of the Quantou.
 Kirk Fox as Detective Don Ovan, a detective who works with Carter and Lee. He and Carter have a strong dislike for each other.
 Steele Gagnon as Derrick, Didi's young son.
 Julianna Guill as Dr. Alice Rosenberger, the medical examiner for the LAPD. She has a huge crush on Lee.
 Diedrich Bader as CIA Agent Westhusing, part of a task force combatting the Quantou.
 Lyman Chen as MSS agent Joseph Yun, Kim's superior. He is outed as corrupt and working for the Quantou after selling Kim out to them in the final episode, and arrested by Carter and Lee.
 James Hong as the Dragon of the Quantou, and the series' main antagonist. He is willing to do anything to take and retain power over Los Angeles, even killing his own son, Zhou Tu. He is killed in the finale by Carter, Lee, and Kim after admitting to having Lee and Kim's parents killed in a hit disguised as a car accident.
 Byron Mann as Fong, the Dragon's loyal right-hand man.

Notable guest stars
 Robyn Lively as FBI Agent Myers
 Lewis Tan as Cheng
 Doug Savant as D.A. Ginardi
 Vernee Watson as "Grandma", Carter's and Gerald's foster mother.
 Janel Parrish as Nina

Episodes

Broadcast

The series premiered on CBS in the United States on March 31, 2016. It aired on E4 in the United Kingdom on April 19, 2016, and the Seven Network in Australia on June 9, 2016.

Filming locations
Among the locations used for filming the series were three places in the San Fernando Valley region of Los Angeles, California: Roscoe Boulevard in Canoga Park, and two locations in Studio City: Universal Inn on Ventura Boulevard, and Vista Pointe II Apartments on Aqua Vista Street.

Reception
Rush Hour received generally negative reviews from critics. Rotten Tomatoes gave the show a 22% approval rating based on reviews from 23 critics. The site's critical consensus states: "Lackluster chemistry and uninspired plotting prevent Rush Hour from living up to its namesake." Metacritic gave season one of the show a score of 46 out of 100 based on 18 reviews, indicating "mixed or average reviews".

Ratings

References

General references

External links
 
 
 

2010s American comedy-drama television series
2010s American crime drama television series
2010s American police comedy television series
2016 American television series debuts
2016 American television series endings
American crime comedy television series
American action television series
English-language television shows
CBS original programming
Live action television shows based on films
Television series by Warner Bros. Television Studios
Martial arts television series
Fictional portrayals of the Los Angeles Police Department
Television shows set in Los Angeles
Television series by New Line Television
American action comedy television series
Rush Hour (franchise)